Walker Stapleton (born April 15, 1974) is an American politician who served two terms as Colorado's State Treasurer from 2011 to 2019. Stapleton was the Republican nominee for Governor of Colorado in the 2018 election, which he lost to Democrat Jared Polis.

Early life and family
Stapleton's family has been active in Colorado since the early 1900s. Walker was born in Washington, D.C., and grew up in Greenwich, Connecticut, attending the private Brunswick School. He graduated from Williams College in Massachusetts, and holds a graduate degree in business economics from the London School of Economics and an MBA from Harvard Business School.

Stapleton's mother, Dorothy Walker Stapleton, is a first cousin once removed of former U.S. President George H. W. Bush, making him a second cousin of former U.S. President George W. Bush and former Florida governor Jeb Bush. He has maintained close ties to the Bush family and credits George H. W. Bush for inspiring him to enter politics. His father is diplomat Craig Roberts Stapleton. His great-grandfather, Benjamin F. Stapleton, served as mayor of Denver from 1923 to 1931 and 1935 to 1947.

Career
Stapleton began his private sector career in 1997 at Hambrecht & Quist as an investment banker. Two years later, he became Director of Business Development for Live365. He subsequently served as CEO and CFO of various private and publicly traded companies, until assuming office as Colorado Treasurer in 2011.

In early 2018, Stapleton, then running for governor of Colorado, was accused by fellow candidate Steve Barlock of paying off the History Colorado Center to remove mention of the family's ties with the white supremacy movement and the beginnings of the Ku Klux Klan in America from their exhibitions.

Stapleton was a 2014 Aspen Institute Rodel Fellow. In January 2022 Governor Jared Polis appointed Stapleton to the state's Economic Development Commission.

Electoral history

References

External links
 Walker Stapleton's website

|-

1974 births
21st-century American politicians
Alumni of the London School of Economics
Bush family
Colorado Republicans
Harvard Business School alumni
Living people
People from Arapahoe County, Colorado
State treasurers of Colorado
Williams College alumni
Candidates in the 2018 United States elections